The following radio stations broadcast on AM frequency 567 kHz:

Australia
4JK in Julia Creek, Queensland (ABC Queensland)
6TP in Mount Tom Price, Western Australia (ABC Western Australia)
6MN in Mount Newman, Western Australia (ABC Western Australia)
6PU in Paraburdoo, Western Australia (ABC Western Australia)
6PN in Pannawonica, Western Australia (ABC Western Australia)

China
CNR-1 in Lianyungang
RTHK Radio 3 at Hong Kong

India
All India Radio NE, Dibrugarh

Japan
JOIK in Sapporo

New Zealand
RNZ National in Wellington

South Africa
567 Cape Talk in Cape Town

South Korea
HLKF in Jeonju (KBS)

United States

Defunct
RTÉ Radio 1 Ireland
Sender Freies Berlin West Berlin

References

Lists of radio stations by frequency